Inflatable bathtub is a specialized bathtub that is portable, and can be used both indoors and outdoors. They are especially well-suited for bathrooms that have shower, but don't have built-in bathtubs. They are also inexpensive and save room space. Some models have built-in accessories such as pillows, backrests and/or armrests, which are all air-inflated, with some models even having cup-holders installed in them. Inflatable bathtubs usually consist of many smaller inflatable parts, together forming a bathtub.

See also

Inflatable air cushion
Inflatable armbands
Inflatable boat
Inflatable building
Inflatable castle
Inflatable costume
Inflatable movie screen
Inflatable rubber dam
Inflatable space habitat
Inflatable tunnel
Inflatable union rat

References

Bathing
Inflatable manufactured goods
Space-saving furniture